The European Union (EU) has strong cultural and historical links to South Africa (particularly through immigration from the Netherlands, Ireland, Germany, France, and Greece) and the EU is South Africa's biggest investor.

Comparison table

Agreements
Since the end of South Africa's apartheid, EU South African relations have flourished and they began a "Strategic Partnership" in 2007. In 1999 the two sides signed a Trade, Development and Cooperation Agreement (TDCA) which entered into force in 2004, with some provisions being applied from 2000. The TDCA covered a wide range of issues from political cooperation, development and the establishment of a free trade area (FTA). The liberalisation schedules were completed by 2012. Since the signing of the Agreement, trade in goods between the two partners has increased by more than 120%, and foreign direct investment has grown five-fold.

Trade
South Africa is the EU's largest trading partner in Southern Africa and has a FTA with the EU. South Africa's main exports to the EU are fuels and mining products (27%), machinery and transport equipment (18%) and other semi-manufactured goods (16%). However they are growing and becoming more diverse. European exports to South Africa are primarily machinery & transport equipment (50%), chemicals (15%) and other semi-machinery (10%).

See also 
 Foreign relations of the European Union 
 Foreign relations of South Africa
 African, Caribbean and Pacific Group of States

References

External links
 EU delegation to South Africa
 South Africa - European Commission Aid and Development
 Outlook on Europe: South Africa’s Relations with the European Union Since the End of Apartheid

 
European Union
Third-country relations of the European Union